Bloodrock 2 is the second album by the Texas rock band Bloodrock. It was released on Capitol Records in October 1970 and produced by Terry Knight. The album was certified Gold by the RIAA in 1990.

In early 1971, the gory extended track "D.O.A." became the biggest hit of Bloodrock's career when it was issued in shorter form as a single. The motivation for writing the song was explained in 2005 by guitarist Lee Pickens. "When I was 17, I wanted to be an airline pilot," Pickens said. "I had just gotten out of this airplane with a friend of mine, at this little airport, and I watched him take off. He went about 200 feet in the air, rolled and crashed."

Track listing

Personnel
Bloodrock
 Rick Cobb – drums
 Eddie Grundy – bass, backing vocals
 Stevie Hill – keyboards, backing vocals
 Lee Pickens – lead guitar
 Jim Rutledge – lead vocals
 Nick Taylor – rhythm guitar, backing vocals

Additional personnel
 Kenneth Hamann – engineering
 Terry Knight – production

Charts
 Album

 Single

References

1970 albums
Bloodrock albums
Albums produced by Terry Knight
Capitol Records albums